Tricoche and Cacolet (French: Tricoche et Cacolet) is a 1938 French comedy film directed by Pierre Colombier and starring Fernandel, Frédéric Duvallès and Ginette Leclerc. It is based on an 1872 play of the same title by Ludovic Halevy and Henri Meilhac. The film's sets were designed by Jacques Colombier. Two idle Parisian boulevardiers set up a detective agency. They are separately hired by a husband and wife to spy on each other with their respective lovers, while a Turkish Prince has fallen in love with both the wife and her husband's mistress. Eventually everything is resolved to everyone's satisfaction.

Cast

References

Bibliography 
 Jean-Louis Ginibre, John Lithgow & Barbara Cady. Ladies Or Gentlemen: A Pictorial History of Male Cross-dressing in the Movies. Filipacchi Publishing, 2005.

External links 
 

1938 films
French comedy films
1938 comedy films
1930s French-language films
Films directed by Pierre Colombier
Films set in Paris
French black-and-white films
Films scored by Casimir Oberfeld
1930s French films